Costinel Andrei Tofan (born 2 August 1996) is a Romanian professional footballer who plays as a right back for Liga I side FC Argeș Pitești. In his career, Tofan also played for teams such as: CS Balotești or Sepsi OSK Sfântu Gheorghe, among others.

References

External links
 
 
 Costinel Tofan at frf-ajf.ro

1996 births
Living people
Sportspeople from Pitești
Romanian footballers
Association football defenders
Liga I players
Liga II players
CS Balotești players
Sepsi OSK Sfântu Gheorghe players
FC Argeș Pitești players